The Place We Ran From is the debut album by the alternative rock/alt country supergroup Tired Pony, released on July 5, 2010, through Polydor/Fiction in the United Kingdom and on July 28, 2010, in the United States by Mom and Pop. The album grew from what was initially a solo project for Snow Patrol songwriter Gary Lightbody which rapidly became a collaboration with members of Belle and Sebastian, R.E.M., and producer Jacknife Lee joining as well as contributions from actress and singer Zooey Deschanel, guitarist M. Ward, and Tom Smith of the indie rock group Editors. The tracks were recorded over the course of one week in January 2010, in Portland, Oregon. The album was recorded over the course of one week in January 2010 and charted in over a half dozen countries.

Recording
Lightbody had a "long-term ambition" of making a country album and revealed the project's existence in May 2009. In the interview, he expressed his love for country music, which he said he had loved for a long time: "I always thought I had a country album in me and it turns out I did." The rest of Snow Patrol expressed excitement for their band-mate, "delighted that [Lightbody was] getting to exercise all his crazy ideas." In October 2009, Lightbody in his blog on Snow Patrol's website revealed the members of the group to be Richard Colburn (of Belle & Sebastian), Iain Archer, singer Miriam Kaufmann (Archer's wife), and Jacknife Lee. He talked about two more members whom he was very excited about, but didn't name them. He also stated that the album won't be country as was being reported, but would be "country-tinged". In January 2010, Hot Press reported Peter Buck (of R.E.M.) to be a member of the group. Lightbody described Buck as one of his "all-time heroes" and admired his talent for playing a variety of instruments.

Promotion
The lead single from The Place We Ran From was "Dead American Writers", released one week prior on Compact Disc and 7". A music video was directed by Paul Fraser featuring Joseph Gilgun lip syncing the lyrics. "Dead American Writers" includes "I Finally Love This Town" as a B-side; the song was later made available through the band's site as a free download. "Get on the Road" was released as a promotional single with an instrumental version of the track as its B-side.

The band also toured through summer and autumn of 2010.

Reception

Critical reception

Rolling Stone gave the album a rating of three stars out of five.

Charting

Track listing
All songs written by Tired Pony
"Northwestern Skies" – 3:49
"Get on the Road" – 4:45
"Point Me at Lost Islands" – 3:11
"Dead American Writers" – 2:34
"Held in the Arms of Your Words" – 6:40
"That Silver Necklace" – 3:49
"I Am a Landslide" – 5:43
"The Deepest Ocean There Is" – 4:58
"The Good Book" – 3:04
"Pieces" – 6:56

American iTunes Store pre-order bonus track
"In the Stockade"

Japanese edition bonus track
"I Finally Love This Town" – 4:58

Compact Disc + MP3 download bonus tracks
"In the Stockade"
"Your Bible"

Release history

Personnel
Tired Pony
Iain Archer – banjo, dobro, acoustic and electric guitar, harpsichord, percussion, vibraphone, vocals on "I Am A Landslide", vocal harmony, backing vocals, composition
Peter Buck – banjo; feedback; glockenspiel; 12-string, acoustic, baritone, electric, and Nashville guitars; mandolin, noise, percussion, composition
Richard Colburn – drums, electric guitar, percussion, typewriter, composition
Jacknife Lee – 12-string acoustic and electric guitars, harpsichord, melodica, organ, pump organ, percussion, piano, vibraphone, composition, engineering, mixing, production
Gary Lightbody – acoustic and electric guitars, pump organ, percussion, vibraphone, vocals, composition
Scott McCaughey – banjo, bass guitar, harmonica, fuzz bass, baritone and electric guitars, percussion, piano, vibraphone, vocal harmony, backing vocals, Wurlitzer, composition
Troy Stewart – bass guitar, dobro, acoustic and electric guitars, percussion, piano, harmony vocal, composition

Additional musicians
Paul Brainard – pedal steel
Fred Chalenor – upright bass
Zooey Deschanel – vocals on "Get on the Road" and "Point Me to Lost Islands"
Betsy Lee – vocals
Esme Lee – vocals
Chris McCormack – electric guitar
Ellen Osborn – vocals
Anna Shelton – bowed saw
Tom Smith – vocals on "The Good Book"
Annalisa Tornfelt – fiddle, violin
Alex Valdivieso – backing vocals
M. Ward – electric guitar and harmony vocal

Technical personnel
Sam Bell – engineering, mixing
Vivian Johnson – photography
Dan Kaufmann – design
Jason Powers – assistant
Adam Selzer – assistant
Nigel Walton – mastering at the Edit Suite, London, England, United Kingdom

References

External links

2010 debut albums
Albums produced by Jacknife Lee
Fiction Records albums
Polydor Records albums
Tired Pony albums
Mom + Pop Music albums